Chloroclystis neoconversa is a moth in the family Geometridae. It is found on the Ryukyu Islands.

References

External links

Moths described in 1971
neoconversa
Moths of Japan